Malcolm Lynch (born 16 March 1988) is a former professional Australian rules footballer who played with the North Melbourne Football Club and the Western Bulldogs in the Australian Football League (AFL).

Originally from the Tiwi Islands in the Northern Territory, Lynch played football in the Northern Territory until he won a scholarship and attended Saint Ignatius' College, Riverview in Sydney. In 2006 Lynch represented the "Flying Boomerangs", Australia's Indigenous youth team, on a tour of South Africa, including a match against the South African Buffaloes, South Africa's national Australian rules team.

Lynch was selected at number 66 overall by the Western Bulldogs at the 2007 AFL Draft and following some impressive displays with the Bulldogs's Victorian Football League (VFL) affiliate Williamstown Football Club, made his AFL debut in round 12 2007 against the Fremantle Dockers. After two senior games with the Bulldogs Lynch was delisted at the end of the 2009 AFL season.

In 2010 Lynch became the first Indigenous Australian to set foot on Antarctica.

In 2012 Lynch was given a second chance at the AFL when he was drafted at 46 by North Melbourne at the 2012 Rookie Draft but after failing to play a senior match was delisted at the end of the 2012 AFL season.

References

External links 
 

1988 births
Australian rules footballers from the Northern Territory
Indigenous Australian players of Australian rules football
Living people
Western Bulldogs players
NSW/ACT Rams players
Tiwi Islands people
Williamstown Football Club players
Werribee Football Club players
Southern Districts Football Club players
Port Melbourne Football Club players
Tiwi Bombers Football Club players
Wanderers Football Club players
Sydney University Australian National Football Club players